Walker & Dunlop, Inc. is a provider of financing services to owners of commercial real estate. It is based in Bethesda, Maryland and originates loans from 38 offices in the United States.

The company was one of the first companies to obtain a Delegated Underwriting and Servicing (DUS) license from Fannie Mae when the program was established in 1988. In 2020, Walker & Dunlop was the largest provider of capital to the multifamily industry in the U.S. and the fourth largest lender to the U.S. commercial real estate industry, based on the 2020 Mortgage Bankers Association loan origination rankings.

History
In 1937, Oliver Walker and Laird Dunlop founded the company.

In 2000, the grandson of Oliver Walker, William M. Walker joined the Board of Directors. In 2003, he became an Executive Vice President, by 2005 he was the President and by 2007 he became Chairman and Chief Executive Officer of the company.

In 2009, the company acquired commercial lender Column Guaranteed, a subsidiary of Credit Suisse.

In 2010, the company became a public company via an initial public offering.

In 2011, the company launched a bridge lending program.

in September 2012, the company acquired CWCapital for $234 million.

In November 2014, the company acquired Johnson Capital's loan origination and servicing platform.

In April 2015, the company acquired Engler Financial Group, investment advisory and brokerage firm focused on providing investment sales services to owners of multifamily properties.

In March 2018, the company acquired JCR Capital Investment Corporation, a Registered Investment Adviser.

In November 2018, the company acquired iCap Realty Advisors.

In 2019, the company acquired Enodo, an artificial intelligence and technology firm.

In January 2020, the company launched an appraisal joint venture with GeoPhy, Apprise by Walker & Dunlop.

In February 2020, the company acquired AKS Partners, one of New York City’s premier, independent capital markets advisory firms. 

In March 2020, the company launched the Walker Webcast, a weekly webcast where CEO, Willy Walker, hosts a diverse network of leaders as they share wisdom that cuts across industry lines. 

In February 2021, the company acquired FourPoint Investment Sales Partners, a boutique brokerage firm specializing in student housing and conventional multifamily properties.

In May 2021, announced the acquisition of industry-leading housing research and investment banking firm Zelman & Associates.

References

External links
 

Companies listed on the New York Stock Exchange
1937 establishments in Maryland
Companies based in Bethesda, Maryland
Real estate companies established in 1937
2010 initial public offerings
Real estate services companies of the United States